Casa Guidi is a writer's house museum in the 15th-century patrician house in Piazza San Felice, 8, near the south end of the Pitti Palace in Florence, Italy. The piano nobile apartment was inhabited by Robert and Elizabeth Barrett Browning between 1847 and Mrs Browning's death in 1861. Their only child, Robert Barrett Browning (known as Pen) was born there in 1849.

Casa Guidi was the subject of her 1851 poem "Casa Guidi Windows".

The Browning household was a centre of British society in Florence although it was said that Theodosia Trollope's house was more care free. There was no animosity however and the Trollope's daughter played with the Browning's son Robert, known as Pen. After Pen's death in 1912 the apartment was bought by several Browning enthusiasts. By that time, Casa Guidi was in poor shape, and the apartment retained hardly any furniture or paintings. The Browning Society in New York restored it, before giving it to Eton College which undertook further work so that the building could be used as a study centre. Today, it is part of The Eton College Collections, but is administered by the Landmark Trust, who also look after the apartment above the one where John Keats died in Rome. When not being used by Eton boys, the property is available for holiday lets booked through the Landmark Trust.

Casa Guidi is open to the public for 3:00–6:00 p.m. on Mondays, Wednesdays and Fridays from April to November. There is no admission fee, but donations are welcome.

References

External links

Casa Guidi information from Eton College
Museums in Florence – Casa Guidi

Year of establishment missing
Historic house museums in Italy
Landmark Trust properties in Italy
Museums in Florence
Literary museums in Italy
Biographical museums in Italy
Eton College